Hong Lok Yuen is one of the 19 constituencies in the Tai Po District.

The constituency returns one district councillor to the Tai Po District Council, with an election every four years. The seat was currently held by nonpartisan Zero Yiu Yeuk-sang.

Hong Lok Yuen constituency is loosely based on Hong Lok Yuen, Cloudy Hill (Kau Lung Hang Shan), Sha Lo Tung and Tai Po Industrial Estate in the northern part of Tai Po District with estimated population of 15,866.

Councillors represented

Election results

2010s

2000s

1990s

Notes

References

Tai Po
Constituencies of Hong Kong
Constituencies of Tai Po District Council
1999 establishments in Hong Kong
Constituencies established in 1999